Artech Digital Entertainment, Ltd. (stylized as ARTECH studios) was a video game developer formed in 1982 in Ottawa, Ontario, Canada. Also known as Artech Studios, the company developed games such as Raze's Hell, Monopoly, Jeopardy!, Wheel of Fortune, and a remake of Q*bert.

The company has developed games for the ColecoVision, Commodore 64, Amiga, Atari computers, Nabu Network, Genesis, PlayStation, PlayStation 2, Xbox, PC, and the Xbox 360. They have also developed a series of interactive games designed for standard DVD players.

Artech Studios closed its doors in December 2011.

Game titles

Nabu Network
 Zot!
 Wiztype
 MacBeth
 Skiing!
 Astro Lander
 BC Matchup

Commodore 64
 Ace of Aces
 BC's Quest for Tires
 B.C. II: Grog's Revenge
 Wiz Math
 The Dam Busters
 Fight Night
 Desert Fox
 Killed Until Dead
 Deceptor
 The Train: Escape to Normandy
 Apollo 18: Mission to the Moon
 Mean 18
 Rack 'Em
 Mental Blocks

ColecoVision
 BC's Quest for Tires

ZX Spectrum
 B.C. II: Grog's Revenge

Amiga
 Heat Wave
 Theatre of War
 Patriot
 Megafortress: The Flight of the Old Dog
 Blue Angels: Formation Flight Simulation
 Blue Max
 Das Boot
 Mental Blocks

Genesis
 Dark Castle
 Motocross Championship (32X)
 Crystal's Pony Tale

Super NES
 BreakThru!

Mac
 Theatre of War
 Patriot
 U.F.O.s

DOS
 Heat Wave: Offshore Superboat Racing
 Fight Night
 The Train: Escape to Normandy
 Mean 18
 Rack 'Em
 Serve and Volley
 Blue Angels
 Mental Blocks
 Blue Max
 Das Boot
 Megafortress
 Theatre of War
 Patriot
 Wild Science Arcade
 Mystery at the Museums
 Rock and Bach
 Director's Lab
 Wild Board Games
 Wild Card Games
 Adventures with Edison
 Play Math
 Wild Ride
 Super Putt
 UFOs - Gnap
 Medieval Times
 Moto Extreme
 Monopoly Star Wars
 Celtica
 Thunder Chrome
 ARA
 Star Wars Playset
 Wheel of Fortune
 Jeopardy!
 Guess Who?
 Family Feud
 Family Fortunes
 Wheel of Fortune 2nd Edition
 Jeopardy 2nd Edition
 Stanley's Tiger Tales
 Music Mix Studio
 Cinderella's Castle Builder

Windows PC
 Arcade Mania
 Super Putt
 Q*Bert
 Monopoly
 My Little Pony: Friendship Gardens
 Trivial Pursuit Unhinged
 Friends: The One with all the Trivia
 The Undergarden
 Aces of the Galaxy
 I Spy Fun House
 U.F.O.s
 Jeopardy 2003
 Wheel of Fortune 2003
 Hello Kitty Cutie World
 Stanley Wild for Sharks
 Tonka Search and Rescue 2
 Power Rangers Ninja Storm

PlayStation
 Wheel of Fortune
 Jeopardy!
 Q*Bert
 Family Feud
 Wheel of Fortune 2nd Edition
 Jeopardy 2nd Edition

PlayStation 2
 Wheel of Fortune PS2
 Jeopardy PS2
 Trivial Pursuit Unhinged
 Friends: The One with all the Trivia

Xbox
 Trivial Pursuit Unhinged
 Raze's Hell

DVD
 Show Me the Wild
 Time Troopers
 Trivial Pursuit: Lord of the Rings
 Scholastic Read with Me DVD!'
 Clue Candyland Clifford/Goosebumps/I-Spy Twister Dance Monopoly Tropical TycoonXbox 360
 Boogie Bunnies Aces of the Galaxy The UndergardenPlayStation 3
 The Undergarden''

References

External links

Video game development companies
Video game companies established in 1982
Video game companies disestablished in 2011
Defunct video game companies of Canada
1982 establishments in Ontario
2011 disestablishments in Ontario